The Deer Creek Limestone is a geologic formation in Iowa. It preserves fossils dating back to the Carboniferous period.

See also

 List of fossiliferous stratigraphic units in Iowa
 Paleontology in Iowa

References
 

Geologic formations of Iowa
Carboniferous System of North America
Carboniferous southern paleotropical deposits